Song Ge may refer to:

 Ehesuma, Chinese composer
 Emily Ge Song, Chinese-American media executive